The Chinese Cooperative Council was a civilian council consisting of leading local Chinese and Eurasians leaders during the Japanese occupation of Hong Kong.

History
After the British surrender, the Japanese tried to consolidate their power by collaborating with the local Chinese leaders. In January 1942, few weeks after the British surrender, Lieutenant General Takashi Sakai invited about 130 leading Chinese and Eurasian leaders in Hong Kong to a formal luncheon set at the Peninsula Hotel in Kowloon. In the meeting, Saikai elaborated the idea of the Greater East Asia Co-Prosperity Sphere where the Chinese and Japanese should cooperate with each other.

After Sakai was replaced by Lieutenant General Isogai Rensuke in late January 1942, two councils, the Chinese Representative Council and the Chinese Cooperative Council were established, replacing the Rehabilitation Advisory Committee on 30 March 1942.

The Chinese Cooperative Council was chaired by Chow Shouson, member of the Executive Council and also Legislative Council of the British Hong Kong government before the war. The 22 members of the council were selected by the three-member (later four) Chinese Representative Council which chaired by Lo Kuk-wo (Robert Kotewall).

The Chinese Cooperative Council was directly responsible to the Japanese governor. Its duties were to report to the governor complaints from the population, to convey decisions and policies of the government and to advise the government on matters concerning the population. Although the council met twice a week to discuss issues, it had limited power. All the council could do was to make suggestions and try to persuade the government to accept it. It also headed the District Affairs Bureaux Councils and the wards which were staffed by Chinese.

Composition

 Chow Shouson, Chairman
 Li Koon-chun, Vice-Chairman
 Chau Tsun-nin
 Cheung Suk-shun
 Fung Tse-ying
 Ip Lan-chuen
 Kwok Chan
 Kwok Chuen
 Lam Kin-yan
 Li Chung-po
 Ling Hong-fat
 Lo Man-kam
 Luk Ngoi-wan
 Ng Wah
 Ngan Shing-kwan
 W. N. T. Tam
 Sze Kai-tung
 Tang Siu-kin
 Tung Chung-wei
 Wong Tak-kwong
 Wong Tung-ming
 Wong Ying-ching

References

1942 establishments in the Japanese colonial empire
1945 disestablishments in China
Japanese occupation of Hong Kong
Organisations based in Hong Kong
Cooperatives in China